Tha Carter II is the fifth studio album by American rapper Lil Wayne. It was released on December 6, 2005, by Cash Money Records, Young Money Entertainment and Universal Records. Recording sessions took place from 2004 to 2005, with Birdman and his brother Ronald "Slim" Williams serving as the record's executive producers. Additional producers on the album included The Runners and The Heatmakerz, among others. The album serves as a sequel to his fourth album Tha Carter (2004), and was supported by three singles ("Fireman", "Hustler Musik" and "Shooter").

Tha Carter II received critical acclaim and ranks highly in retrospectives of Lil Wayne's best work. The album debuted at number two on the US Billboard 200 chart. The album was later certified double platinum by the Recording Industry Association of America (RIAA) in September 2020.

Singles 
The lead single from the album, called "Fireman" was released on October 25, 2005. The song was produced by DVLP and Filthy. While they were recording the song at the time, both DVLP and Filthy first burst into a music scene as the production duo, called Doe Boys.

The album's second single, "Hustler Musik" was released on January 10, 2006. The song was produced by T-Mix and the unknown producer named Batman.

The album's third single, "Shooter" was released on April 9, 2006. The song features guest vocals from an American R&B singer-songwriter Robin Thicke, who also produced this track. The song also was later included on Thicke's then-upcoming album, titled The Evolution of Robin Thicke (2006).

Critical reception 

Upon its release, Tha Carter II received widespread acclaim from music critics, with several praising the lyricism and artistic growth demonstrated by Wayne on the album. AllMusic's David Jeffries praised the album's balance of "hookless, freestyle-ish tracks" and "slicker club singles", commenting that "the well-rounded, risk-taking, but true-to-its-roots album suggests he can weather the highs and lows like a champion." Entertainment Weeklys Ryan Dombal wrote that Tha Carter II "transcends [Wayne's] inflated ego" and complimented the album's "sturdy funk-blues tracks... that offer genuine value". David Drake of Stylus Magazine called the album "one of the year's best releases" and lauded his "entire persona, an aura, a rap creation that seems developed and fascinating". Despite writing that "Wayne's verses need a good polish", Nick Sylvester of Pitchfork wrote that the album contains "jaw-droppers aplenty" and complimented Wayne's growth as a lyricist, stating:

IGN writer Jim During gave the album an eight out of ten and commented that Wayne "[punishes] the mic with hard-hitting verbal tenacity", and wrote that the album shows him "at his most focused, and is a strong next step for a relatively young career." Matt Cibula of PopMatters wrote ambivalently towards that album's production, writing that "the producers here are mostly no-namers who do their jobs well but not spectacularly", but praised Wayne's "amazing" words and remarked that "Straws really IS the best rapper alive, at least when he tries".

In 2020, Rolling Stone ranked it the 370th best album of all time. It was one of only 86 albums from the 21st century to be added to the list.

LA Weekly included the track "Best Rapper Alive" in their list of "Ten Rap-Rock Songs That Are Actually Awesome".

Commercial performance
Tha Carter II debuted at number two on the US Billboard 200 chart, selling 240,000 copies in its first week. This became Wayne's fourth US top-ten debut. The album also debuted at number one on the US Top R&B/Hip-Hop Albums chart, becoming Wayne's third number-one album on this chart. As of March 2008, the album has sold 1.3 million copies in the US. On September 25, 2020, the album was certified double platinum by the Recording Industry Association of America (RIAA) for combined sales and album-equivalent units of over two million units in the United States.

Track listing 

Sample credits
 "Tha Mobb" samples "Moment from Truth", written and performed by Wilson Turbinton.
 "Best Rapper Alive" samples "Fear of the Dark", written by Steve Harris, and performed by Iron Maiden.
 "Grown Man" samples "Sparkle", written by Paul Harden, and performed by Cameo.
 "Receipt" samples "Lay-Away", written by O'Kelly Isley, Jr. and Ronald Isley, and performed by The Isley Brothers.
 "Shooter" samples "Oh Shooter", written and performed by Robin Thicke, also written by Robert Daniels, James Gass and Robert Keyes; as well as Wayne "Shooter" or Thicke "Oh Shooter", also it contains the interpolation from "Mass Appeal" performed by Gang Starr.
 "I'm a D-Boy" samples "Paid in Full", written and performed by Eric Barrier and William Griffin, Jr.
 "Get Over" samples "Love Is What We Came Here For", written by Phill Hurtt and Walter Sigler, and performed by Garland Green.

Personnel 
Credits for Tha Carter II adapted from Allmusic.

 Birdman – producer
 Derrick "Bigg D" Baker – composer, producer
 Katina Bynum – project manager
 D.P. "Dad" Carter – composer
 Dwayne "Lil Wayne" Carter – composer, vocals
 Cool & Dre – multi instruments, producers
 Andrews Correa – audio engineer
 Shante "Curren$y" Franklin – composer
 April DeVona – assistant engineer
 Brian "Big Bass" Gardner – mastering
 Gregory Green – composer
 The Heatmakerz – producers
 David Karmiol – bass guitar
 Lil' Hollywood – engineer
 Patrick Magee – assistant engineer

 Jonathan Mannion – photography
 Tommy Mara – assistant engineer
 Fabian Marasciullo – audio engineer, engineer, mixing
 Kevin Mayer – assistant engineer
 Nikki – vocals
 Danielle Premone – assistant engineer
 Jose Luis Rodríguez – assistant engineer
 Walter "Bunny" Sigler – composer
 Tristan "T-Mix" Jones – producer
 Sean Thomas – composer
 Javier Valverde – engineer
 Ronald "Slim" Williams – executive producer
 Bryan "Baby" Williams – executive producer
 Genevieve Zaragoza – A&R

Charts

Weekly charts

Year-end charts

Certifications

References 

2005 albums
Lil Wayne albums
Universal Records albums
Cash Money Records albums
Albums produced by the Runners
Albums produced by Cool & Dre
Albums produced by Robin Thicke
Sequel albums